Déjà Voodoo is the sixth studio album by southern rock jam band Gov't Mule. The album was released on September 14, 2004, by ATO Records. It was the first Gov't Mule album to feature Andy Hess as a member, and the first studio album to feature Danny Louis as a member. It was also the first album that Gov't Mule did not play live before its release. The title is a reference to the fact that the band believes it rocks just like it used to before the death of former bassist Allen Woody.

Beginning in late 2005, the album was released to include the Mo' Voodoo EP.

Track listing
All songs by Warren Haynes, except where noted.

Personnel
Warren Haynes – vocals, guitar
Matt Abts – drums
Danny Louis – keyboards
Andy Hess – bass

Production
Michael Barbiero – producer, recording engineer, mixer
Steve Bucino – engineer
Ted Young – engineer

References

Gov't Mule albums
2004 albums
ATO Records albums